The Wind Corrected Munitions Dispenser or WCMD system is a US tail kit produced by Lockheed Martin for use with the Tactical Munitions Dispenser family of cluster bombs to convert them to precision-guided munitions. In 1997 the United States Air Force issued contracts to complete development and begin production of the WCMD, planning to modify 40,000 tactical munitions dispensers - 30,000 for CEM and 5,000 each for Gator and SFW - at a cost of US$8,937 per unit.

When fitted with the WCMD the CBU-87 Combined Effects Munition and the CBU-97 Sensor Fuzed Weapon are respectively known as the CBU-103 and the CBU-105; the latter anti-armor weapon was deployed but not used during Operation Allied Force in the Kosovo War, and fired in combat during the 2003 invasion of Iraq.

Variants

WCMD
 Guidance: INS updated with GPS data from launch platform before release.
 Range: .
 Accuracy: 26 m (85 ft) CEP.

WCMD-ER
 Guidance: INS combined with integral GPS.
 Range: Wing kit extends range to 40–65 km (30–40 miles).
 Accuracy: 26 m (85 ft) CEP.

The WCMD-ER program was cancelled in August 2006 due to poor test results and budgetary pressures.

See also
 CBU-87 Combined Effects Munition
 GATOR mine system
 CBU-97 Sensor Fuzed Weapon
 CBU-107 Passive Attack Weapon

References

External links
 WCMD-ER - Deagel
 Wind Corrected Munition Dispenser (WCMD)

Guided bombs of the United States
Cluster munition
Military equipment introduced in the 1990s